Hurley Township is an inactive township in Stone County, in the U.S. state of Missouri.

Hurley Township was erected in 1902, taking its name from the community of Hurley, Missouri.

References

Townships in Missouri
Townships in Stone County, Missouri